Haiderson Hurtado Palomino (born 25 November 1995) is a Colombian footballer who plays as a centre-back for Slovak club MFK Skalica.

Club career

ŠKF Sereď
Haiderson Hurtado made his Fortuna Liga debut for Sereď against Žilina on 25 July 2021.

References

External links
 
 
 Futbalnet profile 

1995 births
Colombian footballers
Colombian expatriate footballers
Association football defenders
Sport Club Genus de Porto Velho players
FC Cascavel players
Paraná Soccer Technical Center players
Paraná Clube players
ŠKF Sereď players
Azuriz Futebol Clube players
MFK Skalica players
Campeonato Brasileiro Série B players
Campeonato Brasileiro Série C players
Campeonato Brasileiro Série D players
Campeonato Paranaense players
Slovak Super Liga players
Colombian expatriate sportspeople in Brazil
Colombian expatriate sportspeople in Slovakia
Expatriate footballers in Brazil
Expatriate footballers in Slovakia
Living people